The Giro d'Italia (also known as the Giro) is an annual multiple-stage bicycle race primarily held in Italy, while also starting in, or passing through, other countries. The first race was organized in 1909 to increase sales of the newspaper La Gazzetta dello Sport, and the race is still run by a subsidiary of that paper's owner. The race has been held annually since its first edition in 1909, except during the two world wars. As the Giro gained prominence and popularity the race was lengthened, and the peloton expanded from primarily Italian participation to riders from all over the world. The Giro is a UCI World Tour event, which means that the teams that compete in the race are mostly UCI WorldTeams, with some additional teams invited as 'wild cards'.

The Giro is one of cycling's prestigious three-week-long Grand Tours, and after the Tour de France is the second most important stage race in the world (the Triple Crown of Cycling denotes the achievement of winning the Giro, the Tour and the UCI Road World Championships in the same season). The Giro is usually held during May, sometimes continuing into early June. While the route changes each year, the format of the race stays the same, with at least two time trials, and a passage through the mountains of the Alps, including the Dolomites. Like the other Grand Tours, the modern editions of the Giro d'Italia normally consist of 21 stages over a 23- or 24-day period that includes two or three rest days.

The rider with the lowest aggregate time is the leader of the general classification and wears the pink jersey. While the general classification gathers the most attention, stage wins are prestigious of themselves, and there are other contests held within the Giro: the points classification, the mountains classification for the climbers, young rider classification for the riders under the age of 25, and the team classification.

History

The idea of the holding a bicycle race that navigated around Italy was inspired by the Tour de France and the success that L'Auto had gained from it. It was first suggested when La Gazzetta dello Sport editor Tullo Morgagni sent a telegram to the paper's owner, Emilio Costamagna, and cycling editor, Armando Cougnet, stating the need for an Italian tour. At the time La Gazzetta'''s rival, Corriere della Sera was planning on holding a bicycle race of its own, after the success they had gained from holding an automobile race. Morgagni then decided to try and hold their race before Corriere della Sera could hold theirs, but La Gazzetta lacked the money. However, after the success La Gazzetta had with creating the Giro di Lombardia and Milan–San Remo, the owner Costamagna decided to go through with the idea. Their bike race was announced on 7 August 1908 in the first page of that day's edition of La Gazzetta dello Sport. The race was to be held in May 1909.

Since the organizers lacked the 25,000 lire needed to hold the race, they consulted Primo Bongrani, an accountant at the bank Cassa di Risparmio and friend of the three organizers. Bongrani proceeded to go around Italy asking for donations to help hold the race. Bongrani's efforts were largely successful, he had procured enough money to cover the operating costs. Prize money was supplied by a casino in San Remo who Francesco Sghirla, a former Gazzetta employee, encouraged to contribute to the race. Even Corriere, La Gazzetta's rival, gave 3,000 lire to the race's fund.

On 13 May 1909 at 02:53 am 127 riders started the first Giro d'Italia at Loreto Place in Milan. The race was split into eight stages covering . A total of 49 riders finished, with Italian Luigi Ganna winning. Ganna won three individual stages and the General Classification. Ganna received 5,325 lire as a winner's prize, with the last rider in the general classification receiving 300 lire. The Giro's director received only 150 lire a month, 150 lire fewer than the last-placed rider.

The first Giro was won by Luigi Ganna, while Carlo Galetti won the two following Giros. In 1912, there was no individual classification, instead there was only a team classification, which was won by Team Atala. The 1912 Giro is the only time the competition has not had an individual classification. From 1914 onwards the scoring format was changed from a points-based system to a time-based system, in which the cyclist who had the lowest aggregate time at the end of the race would win. The Giro was suspended for four years from 1915 to 1918, due to the First World War. Costante Girardengo was the winner of the first Giro after the war in 1919.

The dominant figure in the 1920s was Alfredo Binda, who won his first Giro in 1925 and followed this up with another victory in 1927, in which he won 12 of the 15 stages. Victory in 1929 came courtesy of eight successive stage wins. At the height of his dominance Binda was called to the head office of La Gazzetta dello Sport in 1930; the newspaper accused him of ruining the race and offered him 22,000 lire to be less dominant, which he refused. Binda won five Giros before he was usurped as the dominant cyclist by Gino Bartali. Nicknamed the "Iron Man of Tuscany" for his endurance, Bartali won two Giros during the 1930s, in 1936 and 1937. Bartali's dominance was challenged in 1940, the last Giro before the Second World War, when he was defeated by his 20-year-old teammate Fausto Coppi.

The rivalry between Bartali and Coppi intensified after the war. Bartali won his last Giro in 1946, with Coppi winning his second the following year. Coppi won a further three Giros and in 1952 he became the first cyclist to win the Tour de France and Giro in the same year. Swiss Hugo Koblet became the first non-Italian to win the race in 1950. No one dominated the tour during the 1950s, Coppi, Charly Gaul and Fiorenzo Magni each won two Giros during the decade. The 1960s were similar, five-time Tour de France winner Jacques Anquetil won in 1960, and 1964, while Franco Balmamion won two successive Giros in 1962 and 1963.

Belgian Eddy Merckx was the dominant figure during the 1970s. His first victory came in 1968; another triumph in 1970 was followed by three successive victories from 1972 to 1974, which is the record for the most successive victories in the Giro. Merckx was also wearing the Maglia Rosa late in the 1969 edition when he was accused of doping in one of the most controversial scandals in Giro history. The UCI would lift his suspension almost immediately but Merckx was not allowed to start stage 17 and Felice Gimondi outperformed all of the remaining riders to claim the victory. Unfortunately in 1976 a rider died in an accident early in the race which stunned the riders, fans and race officials equally. By the third week it seemed as though Belgian rider Johan De Muynck was going to claim victory, but much to the delight of the Tifosi Gimondi rode a very strong final Individual Time Trial and won his third Giro by a very small margin in rather stunning fashion as he was getting older and not even considered a pre-race favorite. Belgians Michel Pollentier and Johan De Muynck won the two subsequent Giros in 1977 and 1978. In 1980, Frenchman Bernard Hinault became France's first winner since Anquetil in 1964. He would win another two Giros in 1982 and 1985.

American Andrew Hampsten became the first non-European winner in 1988, and the first South American winner was Nairo Quintana of Colombia in 2014. Spaniard Miguel Indurain, winner of five Tours, won successive Giros in 1991 and 1992. Ivan Gotti's wins in 1997 and 1999 were either side of the first win by Marco Pantani's win in 1998, a year in which he completed the Tour and Giro double.

Gilberto Simoni was the winner in 2001 and 2003, with Paolo Savoldelli victorious in 2002 and 2005. Other repeat winners this century have been Ivan Basso (2006 and 2010), Spaniard Alberto Contador in 2008 and 2015 and Vincenzo Nibali in 2013 and 2016.  Contador also looked to have won the 2011 edition, a race during which Wouter Weylandt suffered a fatal crash on the third stage, but he was later stripped of the title after he was found guilty of doping in the 2010 Tour de France, and runner-up Michele Scarponi was awarded the victory. In 2017 Tom Dumoulin became the first Dutch rider to win the Giro. In 2018 Simon Yates seemed to be in very good position to become the first British rider to win, but he cracked late in the race which gave Dumoulin an opportunity to repeat as champion, however Chris Froome ended up launching a surprising long range solo attack to steal the victory, which made him the first British rider to ever win the Giro. In 2019 Richard Carapaz, from Ecuador, became the first rider from his country to win the race.

In 2020, the COVID-19 pandemic forced the postponement of the Giro to October, marking the only time in history that the Giro was not raced in May or June. This race was won by Tao Geoghegan Hart, making him the second British rider to win the race; then in the 2021 edition Egan Bernal became the second Colombian to ever win and in 2022 Jai Hindley became the first ever Australian to win.

Classifications

A few riders from each team aim to win overall but there are three further competitions to draw riders of all specialties: points, mountains, and a classification for young riders with general classification aspirations. The oldest of the four classifications is the general classification. The leader of each aforementioned classifications wears a distinctive jersey. If a rider leads more than one classification that awards, he wears the jersey of the most prestigious classification. The abandoned jersey is worn by the rider who is second in the competition.

General classification

The most sought after classification in the Giro d'Italia is the general classification. All of the stages are timed to the finish, and after finishing the riders' times are compounded with their previous stage times, so the rider with the lowest aggregate time is the leader of the race. The leader is determined after each stage's conclusion. The leader of the race also has the privilege to wear the race leader's pink jersey. The jersey is presented to the leader rider on a podium in the stage's finishing town. If a rider is leading more than one classification that awards a jersey, he will wear the maglia rosa since the general classification is the most important one in the race. The lead can change after each stage.

The color pink was chosen as the magazine that created the Giro, La Gazzetta dello Sport, printed its newspapers on pink paper. The pink jersey was added to the race in the 1931 edition and it has since become a symbol of the Giro d'Italia. The first rider to wear the pink jersey was Learco Guerra. Riders usually try to make the extra effort to keep the jersey for as long as possible in order to get more publicity for the team and the sponsor(s) of the team. Eddy Merckx wore the jersey for 78 stages, more than any other rider in the history of the Giro d'Italia. Three riders have won the general classification five times in their career: Alfredo Binda, Fausto Coppi, and Eddy Merckx.

The general classification winner was not always determined by a time system. In the inaugural Giro d'Italia the organizers chose to have a points system over a system based around elapsed time after the scandal that engulfed the 1904 Tour de France. In addition to that, the organizers chose the point system since it would be cheaper to count the placings of the riders rather than clocking the riders during each stage. The race leader was calculated by adding up each rider's placings in each stage and the rider with the lowest total was the leader; if a rider placed second in the first stage and third in the second stage, he would have five points total. The system was modified a year later to give the riders who placed 51st or higher in a stage 51 points and keep the point distribution system the same for the riders who placed 1st through 50th in a stage. The calculation remained unmodified until 1912 where the organizers chose to have the race be centered around teams, while still keeping the point system. The next year race organizers chose to revert to the system used in 1911. In 1914, the organizers shifted to the system used nowadays, where riders would have their finishing times for each stage totaled together to determine the overall leader.

These are the time bonuses that the riders receive for crossing the lines in the first few positions:

Mountains classification

The mountains classification is the second oldest jersey awarding classification in the Giro d'Italia. The mountains classification was added to the Giro d'Italia in 1933 Giro d'Italia and was first won by Alfredo Binda. During mountain stages of the race, points are awarded to the rider who is first to reach the top of each significant climb. Points are also awarded for riders who closely follow the leader up each climb. The number of points awarded varies according to the hill classification, which is determined by the steepness and length of the course.

The climbers' jersey is worn by the rider who, at the start of each stage, has the largest number of climbing points. If a rider leads two or more of the categories, the climbers' jersey is worn by the rider in second, or third, place in that contest. At the end of the Giro, the rider holding the most climbing points wins the classification. In fact, some riders, particularly those who are neither sprinters nor particularly good at time-trialing, may attempt only to win this particular competition within the race. The Giro has four categories of mountains. They range from category 4, the easiest, to category 1, the hardest. There is also the Cima Coppi, the highest point reached in a particular Giro, which is worth more points than the race's other first-category climbs. Gino Bartali has won the mountains classification a record seven times.

The classification awarded no jersey to the leader until the 1974 Giro d'Italia, when the organizers decided to award a green jersey to the leader. The green jersey was used until 2012, when the classification's sponsor, Banca Mediolanum, renewed its sponsorship for another four years and desired the jersey to be blue rather than green.

The point distribution for the mountains is as follows:

Points classification

The points classification is the third oldest of the four jersey current awarding classifications in the Giro d'Italia. It was introduced in the 1966 Giro d'Italia and was first won by Gianni Motta. Points are given to the rider who is first to reach the end of, or determined places during, any stage of the Giro. The red jersey is worn by the rider who at the start of each stage, has the largest number of points. The rider who, at the end of the Giro, holds the most points, wins the points competition. Each stage win, regardless of the stage's categorization, awards 25 points, second place is worth 20 points, third 16, fourth 14, fifth 12, sixth 10, and one point less per place down the line, to a single point for fifteenth. This means that a true sprinter might not always win the points classification. The classification was added to draw the participation of the sprinters. The classification has been won four times by two riders: Francesco Moser and Giuseppe Saronni.

In addition, stages can have one or more intermediate sprints: 8, 6, 4, 3, 2, 1 point(s) are/is awarded to the first six cyclists passing these lines. These points also count toward the TV classification (Traguardo Volante, or "flying sprint"), a separate award.

The first year the points classification was used, it had no jersey that was given to the leader of the classification. In the 1967 Giro d'Italia, the red jersey was added for the leader of the classification. However, in 1969 the red jersey was changed to a cyclamen (purple) colored jersey. It remained that color until 2010 when the organizers chose to change the jersey back to the color red in a return to the original color scheme for the three minor classifications, which reflected the colors of the Italian flag. However, in April 2017 RCS Sport, the organisers of the Giro, announced that the maglia ciclamino would be revived for the 2017 Giro d'Italia.

The point distribution for the sprints are as follows:

Young rider classification

The young rider classification is restricted to riders who are no older than 25 during that calendar year. The leader of the classification is determined the same way as the general classification, with the riders' times being added up after each stage and the eligible rider with lowest aggregate time is dubbed the leader. This classification was added to the Giro d'Italia in the 1976 edition, with Alfio Vandi being the first to win the classification after placing seventh overall. The classification was not contested between the years of 1995 and 2006. The classification was reintroduced in the 2007, and has been in each Giro since. The Giro d'Italia awards a white jersey to the leader of the classification. Evgeni Berzin, Nairo Quintana and Tao Geoghegan Hart won the young rider classification and the general classification in the same year : in 1994, 2014 and 2020. Four riders have won the young rider classification twice in their respective careers: Vladimir Poulnikov, Pavel Tonkov, Bob Jungels and Miguel Ángel López.

Team classifications

There are two team classifications that are contested at the Giro d'Italia: the Trofeo Fast Team and the Trofeo Super Team. The Trofeo Fast Team is the older of the two as it was introduced in the first Giro d'Italia. It was first won by Atala. The Trofeo Fast Team is determined by adding the times of the best three cyclists per team on each stage; the leading team is the team with the lowest total time. The classification was simply called the team classification in each edition until the organizers changed it to the Trofeo Fast Team for the 1994 Giro d'Italia.  won the Trofeo Fast Team classification in 2018.

The Trofeo Super Team was introduced at the 1993 Giro d'Italia. The name Trofeo Super Team was adopted for the 1994 edition of the Giro and been used ever since. The classification was first won by Ariostea in 1993. The classification is a team points classification, with the top 20 placed riders on each stage earning points (20 for first place, 19 for second place and so on, down to a single point for 20th) for their team.

Minor classifications

Other less well-known classifications, whose leaders did not receive a special jersey, are awarded during the Giro. These awards were based on points earned throughout the three weeks of the tour. Each mass-start stage had one intermediate sprint, the Traguardo Volante, or T.V. The T.V. gave bonus seconds towards the general classification, points towards the regular points classification, and also points towards the T.V. classification. This award was known by various names in previous years, and was previously time-based. In 2013 this classification was renamed to the sprints classification and was won by Rafael Andriato.

Other awards include the Combativity classification, which was a compilation of points gained for position on crossing intermediate sprints, mountain passes and stage finishes. It was won by Mark Cavendish in 2013. The Azzurri d'Italia classification is based on finishing order; however, points were awarded only to the top three finishers in each stage. It was also most recently won by Mark Cavendish. Additionally, the Trofeo Fuga Pinarello rewarded riders who took part in a breakaway at the head of the field, each rider in an escape of ten or fewer riders getting one point for each kilometre that the group stayed clear. 's Rafael Andriato was first in this competition in 2013. Teams were given penalty points for minor technical infringements. Several teams tied for the Fair Play classification in 2018 (and also in 2021), not receiving any points (the team's best placed rider in the General Classification then serves as a tie-breaker).

Defunct classifications

In 1946 the maglia nera (black jersey) was introduced and awarded the cyclist who was last in the general classification. Riders sometimes deliberately wasted time in order to become last overall and so wear the black jersey. The classification was short lived, as it was last contested in the 1951 Giro d'Italia. The classification was won twice by Luigi Malabrocca, who won the classification in 1946 and 1947. The last winner of the maglia nera was Giovanni Pinarello.

The intergiro classification was introduced in 1989 and first won by Yugoslavian Jure Pavlič. In each stage there would be a point, before the finish, where the riders would be timed until they crossed the line. The times from each stage would then be added together for each rider to determine the leader of the classification. The leader of the classification was awarded a blue jersey. The classification was run each year since its addition until 2005. The last winner of the classification was Stefano Zanini. Fabrizio Guidi won the classification three times, the most by any rider. Guidi won the classification in 1996, 1999, and 2000.

There was also a combination classification that was introduced in the 1985 Giro d'Italia and was first won by Urs Freuler. The classification was discontinued after the 1988 Giro d'Italia. For the 1988 edition of the Giro, the classification awarded a blue jersey. However, the classification was reintroduced for the 2006 Giro d'Italia and was won by Paolo Savoldelli. The classification was not brought back in the 2007 Giro d'Italia.

The race

The Giro d'Italia contains either 21 or 20 stages and a prologue (an individual time trial under  in length) and two or three rest days. There are three types of stages that are used in the Giro d'Italia: the mass-start stages, individual time trials, and team time trials. The mass-start stages make up most of the 21 racing days of each year's Giro d'Italia, there are usually two time trials in each edition of the Giro d'Italia, and sometimes three if there is a prologue or team time trial. In mass start stages there are time bonuses of ten, six and four seconds for the first three finishers, and, in some years, bonuses of three, two and one seconds at intermediate sprints. Italian Mario Cipollini holds the record of 42 stage victories.

The Giro d'Italia is known for its steep and difficult climbs. Each race features a few stages that contain many climbs of high severity. The race traditionally passes through the Alps with some of the longest climbs in the Dolomites. The first Alpine pass included was the Sestriere in 1911. The Dolomites were first included in the Giro in 1937, when the race crossed over the Rolle Pass and the Passo di Costalunga. Some of the most famous mountains used in the Giro are the Passo dello Stelvio, Passo Pordoi, and the Passo di Gavia. Since 1965 the highest point in the Giro d'Italia has been dubbed the Cima Coppi in honor of the great Italian climber Fausto Coppi.

A time trial is sometimes used as the penultimate or final stage, and some editions have featured a mountain time trial stage. The first stage in modern Giros is often a short trial, a prologue, to decide who wears pink on the opening day. The first prologue occurred in the 1968 Giro d'Italia. The route stretched  around the streets of Campione d'Italia and was won by the Frenchman Charly Grosskost. The riders raced the course in an unusual format, with the riders racing in ten groups of thirteen and the time not being counted towards their overall time.

The first team time trial occurred in the 1937 Giro d'Italia and was won by the Italian team, Legnano.

The Giro takes place mainly in Italy, but some stages have departure or conclusion locations in, or pass through, the neighboring countries of San Marino, France, Switzerland, Austria, Slovenia and Vatican City State.  The other countries visited, usually in connection with the opening stages of the race, are Belgium, Luxembourg, Croatia, Denmark, Ireland, Germany, Greece, Israel, Netherlands, Monaco and the United Kingdom.

The start and finish of the Giro

For nearly half a century, the Giro started and finished by Milan, the city where the headquarters of the Gazzetta dello Sport is located. In 1911 these events took place in Rome to celebrate the 50th anniversary of Italy's unification. With the occasional exception, the start and finish in Milan were the standard for the Giro d'Italia. However, since the 1960s the place of departure has changed each year and finishes in cities such as Verona, Brescia, Trieste, Turin and Rome have become more frequent.

The start of the Giro d'Italia (La Grande Partenza'') is a significant occasion and cities invest heavily, hoping to recoup the cost in tourism, exposure and other benefits: Denmark spent an estimated $3.86 million to host the opening stages of the 2012 edition.

Starts outside Italy

For the first 47 editions of the race, the race started on Italian soil. In 1965 the race made its first foreign start in San Marino, and has since had twelve more foreign starts. The 2018 start in Jerusalem, Israel was met with controversy as activists called for the race to be moved, claiming that the race whitewashes Israel's human rights record. Ultimately, the race went ahead as scheduled and every team selected for the Giro took part, including two teams of Arabic ownership: the Bahrain-Mérida team and the United Arab Emirates team. The intended start of the 2020 race in Hungary was cancelled due to the COVID-19 pandemic.

See also

 Giro d'Italia Femminile
 List of Giro d'Italia general classification winners
 UCI ProTour

References

External links

 

 
Cycle races in Italy
Recurring sporting events established in 1909
UCI ProTour races
UCI World Tour races
1909 establishments in Italy
Grand Tour (cycling)
Annual sporting events in Italy
May sporting events
June sporting events
Challenge Desgrange-Colombo races
Super Prestige Pernod races